Leading Lady may refer to:
 Leading lady
 Leading Lady (film), a 2014 comedy drama film
 Leading Lady (album), a 1991 album by Marina Prior
 Leading Lady: The Ultimate Collection, a greatest hits album by Marina Prior 2015
“Leading Lady” Iva Davies 1975
“Leading Lady” Letters From Birmingham (Ruben Studdard album)
Leading Lady, Stephen Galloway biography of movie executive Sherry Lansing